Gradiva is a novel by Wilhelm Jensen, first published in instalments from June 1 to July 20, 1902 in the Viennese newspaper "Neue Freie Presse". It was inspired by a Roman bas-relief of the same name and became the basis for Sigmund Freud's famous 1907 study Delusion and Dream in Jensen's Gradiva. Freud owned a copy of this bas-relief, which he had joyfully beheld in the Vatican Museums in 1907; it can be found on the wall of his study (the room where he died) in 20 Maresfield Gardens, London – now the Freud Museum.

Plot synopsis
The story is about an archaeologist named Norbert Hanold who is obsessed with a woman depicted in a bas-relief that he sees in a museum in Rome. After his return to Germany, he manages to get a plaster-cast of the relief, which he hangs on a wall in his work-room and contemplates daily. He comes to feel that her calm, quiet manner does not belong in bustling, cosmopolitan Rome, but rather in some smaller city, and one day an image comes to him of the girl in the relief walking on the peculiar stepping-stones that cross the streets in Pompeii. Soon afterwards, Hanold dreams that he has been transported back in time to meet the girl whose unusual gait so captivates him. He sees her walking in the streets of Pompeii while the hot ashes of Vesuvius subsume the city in 79 AD.

This fantastical dream leads Hanold on a real journey to Rome, Naples, and ultimately Pompeii, where, amazingly, he sees the Gradiva of his bas-relief stepping calmly and buoyantly across the lava stepping-stones. He follows her, loses her, then finds her sitting on the low steps between two pillars. He greets her in Latin, only to be answered, "If you wish to speak to me, you must do so in German." When he addresses her as if she were the girl of his dream, however, she looks at him without comprehension, gets up and leaves. Hanold calls out after her, "Are you coming here again tomorrow in the noon hour?" But she does not turn round, gives no answer, and a few moments later disappears round the corner. Hanold hurries after her, but she is nowhere to be seen. What follows is his quest to determine whether the woman he has seen is real or a delusion.

Films
In 1970, the Italian actor and filmmaker Giorgio Albertazzi released a film titled Gradiva, based on Jensen's novel and featuring Laura Antonelli as Gradiva. Albertazzi is best known for his portrayal of the male protagonist in Last Year at Marienbad, written by Alain Robbe-Grillet, who would himself go on to direct a film based on Jensen's novel.

In 2006, the French writer and filmmaker Alain Robbe-Grillet (died 2008) released a film titled  ("It's Gradiva Who is Calling You"), which was roughly based on the novel, although updated to more recent times (no earlier than the 1970s). It begins with an English art historian named John Locke who is doing research in Morocco on the paintings and drawings that French artist Eugène Delacroix (1798 – 1863) produced over a century before, when he travelled to the country, then a French colony, as part of a diplomatic mission. Locke spots a beautiful, mysterious blonde girl (Gradiva) in flowing robes dashing through the back alleys of Marrakech, and becomes consumed with the need to track her down. Like most of Robbe-Grillet's cinematic output, the film is highly surreal and also has explicit scenes of sex slavery, nudity and sadomasochism.

Jensen’s novella and Freud’s analysis 
Sigmund Freud analyzed the actions and dreams of this young archaeologist in his 1908 study, Der Wahn und die Träume in W. Jensens Gradiva. Freud's study saved the novella from obscurity and made Gradiva into a modern mythological figure.

Freud's analysis is one of his first analyses of a literary work. Freud owned a copy of this relief, which hangs in his study at 20 Maresfield Gardens, London, now the Freud Museum. 

Recently discovered letters show Freud corresponded with Jensen.

References

External links
 
 Freud Museum, Vienna: Sigmund Freud Museum Wien / Vienna - Sigmund Freud Privatstiftung
 Freud Museum, London: Freud Museum London
 The relief at the Freud Museum, London: Visiting Freud's Home In London - New York Times

1903 German-language novels
1996 films
1903 German novels
Campania in fiction
Case studies by Sigmund Freud
1990s French-language films
French drama films
German novels adapted into films
German romance novels
Novels about museums
Novels about psychoanalysis
Pompeii in popular culture
S. Fischer Verlag books